Marco Costa (born 7 April 1997) is an Italian footballer who plays as a centre back for Borgosesia Calcio. He began his senior career with Monza in the 2014–15 Lega Pro season, and also played at that level in 2015–16 on loan at Giana Erminio.

References

1997 births
Living people
Italian footballers
Association football fullbacks
A.C. Monza players
A.S. Giana Erminio players
Serie C players
Serie D players
S.C. Caronnese S.S.D. players